Faragher is a surname of Manx origin.

Surname
Danny Faragher (born 1947), American rock/soul musician
Davey Faragher (born 1957), American bass guitarist
Donna Faragher (born 1975), Australian, politician
Edward Faragher (1831-1908), Manx poet, folklorist and cultural guardian
Harold Faragher (1917–2006), English cricketer
John Mack Faragher (born 1945), American historian
Kathleen Faragher (1904-1974), Manx writer
Ramsey Faragher (born 1981), British entrepreneur
Tommy Faragher, American music composer and producer

Other
The Faragher Brothers, a musical group.
Faragher v. City of Boca Raton, US supreme court case.

References

Surnames of Manx origin
Manx-language surnames